White Reggae Troll is a Devendra Banhart single that was released 2006 on XL Records.

Track list
 White Reggae Troll / Africa

References

2006 singles